Niyaz Hasan Khan (1918–2007), also spelled Niaz, was an Indian National Congress leader and former MLA from Kunda (Vidhan Sabha constituency) in Uttar Pradesh.

Niyaz Hasan Khan was MLA of Kunda (कुंडा / कुंडाहरनामगंज) from 1962 to 1969, 1974 to 1977, 1980 to 1991. He won 6 Vidhan Sabha elections from Kunda and lost three times. He was Speaker of UP Assembly at some point during his long tenure as MLA.

References

People from Pratapgarh, Uttar Pradesh
Uttar Pradesh MLAs 1962–1967
Uttar Pradesh MLAs 1967–1969
Uttar Pradesh MLAs 1974–1977
Uttar Pradesh MLAs 1980–1985
Uttar Pradesh MLAs 1985–1989
1918 births
2007 deaths
Indian National Congress politicians from Uttar Pradesh